Grant Young may refer to:
Grant Young (footballer) (born 1971), New Zealand international association football player
Grant Young (musician) (born 1964), drummer with Soul Asylum
Grant Young (rugby league) (born 1970), New Zealand rugby league player